Peralta is a Spanish surname. It is also an Italian surname found in Sicily, Piedmont, and Tuscany.

The first time that this name appeared was during the Middle Age when people started to take surnames related to their father's name, in this case, the Italian name Pietro.

This name has its origins in the Latin words pietra which means rock, and alta, which refers to being tall or big.

Notable people with the surname Peralta include:

 Abel Peralta (born 1989), Argentine footballer
 Alejo Peralta, Mexican businessman
 Alice Peralta (born 1990), Japanese voice actress
 Amanda Peralta (1939–2009), Argentine guerrilla fighter and academic
 Ángela Peralta (1845–1883), Mexican opera singer
 Arnold Peralta (1989–2015), Honduran footballer
 Austin Peralta (1990–2012), American jazz musician
 Chad Peralta (born 1985), Filipino-Australian singer and actor
 Chichí Peralta (born 1966), Dominican musician
 Carlos Peralta, Mexican businessman and baseball team owner
 Carlos Peralta (swimmer) (born 1994), Spanish swimmer
 Daniel Peralta (born 1955), Argentine politician
 David Peralta (born 1987), Venezuelan baseball player
 Diosdado Peralta (born 1952), Filipino attorney and jurist
 Domingo Peralta (born 1986), Dominican footballer
 Elda Peralta, Mexican film actress
 Eugenio Peralta (born 1977), Paraguayan footballer
 Felipe Peralta (born 1962), Paraguayan footballer
 Francisco Peralta (1943–2020), Spanish archer
 Freddy Peralta (born 1996), Dominican baseball player
 Gonzalo Peralta (born 1980), Argentine footballer
 Gregorio Peralta (1935–2001), Argentine boxer
 Guglielmo Peralta, Italian noble
 Hiro Peralta (born 1994), actor from the Philippines
 Horacio Peralta (born 1982), Uruguayan footballer
 Ignacio Peralta (1791–1874), Spanish settler in California
 Irma Peralta (born 1936), Mexican ceramist
 Isaías Peralta (born 1987), Chilean footballer
 Jhonny Peralta (born 1982), Dominican baseball player
 Joel Peralta (born 1976), Dominican baseball player
 Jose Peralta (1971–2018), American politician
 José Francisco de Peralta (1786–1844), Costa Rican priest and politician
 Juan Peralta (born 1990), Spanish cyclist
 Julio Peralta (born 1981), Chilean tennis player
 Leonel Peralta (born 1992), Argentine footballer
 Luís María Peralta (1759–1851), soldier and owner of Rancho San Antonio
 Macario Peralta, Jr. (1913–1965), Filipino WWII guerrilla commander
 Marcelo Peralta (1961–2020), Argentine musician
 María Peralta (born 1977), Argentine runner
 María Teresa de Larraín y Guzmán Peralta (1785 – c. 1840), former First Lady of Chile and wife of President Agustín Eyzaguirre
 Marlo Peralta (born 1950), Filipino clergyman
 Martín Peralta (born 1997), Argentine footballer
 Nahuel Peralta (born 1991), Argentine footballer
 Oribe Peralta (born 1984), Mexican footballer
 Orlin Peralta (born 1990), Honduran footballer
 Osvaldo Peralta (born 1971), Paraguayan footballer
 Pedro de Peralta (about 1583–1659), Spanish governor of Santa Fé de Nuevo México (1609-1614)
 Rafael Peralta (1979–2004), U.S. Marine nominated for the Medal of Honor
 Raúl Peralta (born 1940), Argentine-Portuguese tennis player
 Robbie Peralta (born 1986), American mixed martial artist
 Rodrigo Peralta (born 1988), Mexican racing driver
 Sixto Peralta (born 1979), Argentine football player
 Stacy Peralta (born 1957), American director and former professional skateboarder
 Víctor Peralta (disambiguation), multiple people
 Wandy Peralta (born 1991), Dominican baseball player
 Wily Peralta (born 1989), Dominican baseball player
 Winibian Peralta (born 1997), Dominican footballer
 Yamil Peralta (born 1991), Argentinian boxer

Fictional
 Jake Peralta, lead character on the American television series Brooklyn Nine-Nine

Italian-language surnames
Spanish-language surnames